No. 121 Helicopter Flight is a fighter squadron and is equipped with Mil Mi-8 and based at Santa Cruz Air Force Station.

History

Assignments

Aircraft
Mi-8/8T

References

121